Nelsen is a Norwegian or Danish surname that may also refer to:

People
 Ancher Nelsen (1904–1992), American politician
 Bill Nelsen (1941-2019), American football player and coach
 Bruce G. Nelsen (born 1935), American politician
 Donald Nelsen (born 1944), American Olympic cyclist
 Eric Nelsen (born 1991), American actor
 Grace Nelsen Jones (1893–2006), oldest verified person born in the state of Virginia, USA
 Jeff Nelsen (born 1969), Canadian French horn player
 Marlin B. Nelsen (1936-1980), American chiropractor and politician
 Nels Nelsen (1894–1943), member of the Canadian Ski Hall of Fame
 Rod Nelsen, creator of computer game Tharolian Tunnels
 Ryan Nelsen (born 1977), New Zealand footballer
 Travis Nelsen, member of the indie folk band Okkervil River

Other uses
 Nelsen Middle School, Renton, Washington, USA
 Nels Nelsen Historic Area, and Nels Nelsen Ski Jump, Mount Revelstoke National Park, British Columbia, Canada

See also
 Nelson (disambiguation)
 Nielsen (disambiguation)